Mohammad Nuh (born 17 June 1959 in Surabaya) is the former Minister of Education and Culture of Indonesia in the Second United Indonesia Cabinet of Susilo Bambang Yudhoyono.

Nuh was born on 17 June 1959 in Surabaya into a large farming family. By profession an electrical engineer, he was educated at Sepuluh Nopember Institute of Technology and Montpellier 2 University, France.

References

1959 births
Living people
Indonesian Muslims
Academic staff of Sepuluh Nopember Institute of Technology
People from Surabaya
Education ministers of Indonesia
Sepuluh Nopember Institute of Technology alumni